Lepetella barrajoni is a species of sea snail, a marine gastropod mollusk in the family Lepetellidae.

Description

Distribution
This marine species occurs off Spain and Portugal.

References

 Gofas, S.; Le Renard, J.; Bouchet, P. (2001). Mollusca, in: Costello, M.J. et al. (Ed.) (2001). European register of marine species: a check-list of the marine species in Europe and a bibliography of guides to their identification. Collection Patrimoines Naturels, 50: pp. 180–213

Lepetellidae
Gastropods described in 1994